42nd Group may refer to:

 42nd Support Group (United Kingdom), a unit of the United Kingdom Army 
 Marine Aircraft Group 42, a unit of the United States Marine Corps 
 42d Air Base Wing (42nd Bombardment Group), a unit of the United States Air Force

See also
 42nd Division (disambiguation)
 42nd Brigade (disambiguation)
 42nd Regiment (disambiguation)
 42nd Battalion (disambiguation)
 42nd Squadron (disambiguation)